Z1 Boat is a brand of luxury yacht tender manufactured in the United States. Most notably, the 23 foot sportsboat, with a V-hull design made of fiberglass or Carbon / Kevlar laminate schedule, with an inboard motor, foot controls, and side steering console. The speedboats are manufactured by Z1 Boats, Inc.

Purposes
It is used for sport fishing, water skiing, as a runabout, as a tender on luxury yachts and as a high performance sport boat.

Manufacturing
Z1 boats were originally manufactured in Florida. The boats are equipped with very powerful Mercury Marine engines, and Bravo series sterndrive.
All modern boats under twenty feet manufactured for sale in the United States are required by law to have positive flotation so that a completely swamped boat will still float.

Current models
The current production model is the twenty-three foot, Luxury yacht tender, winner of the 2003 Miami International Boat Show sexiest boat award.

See also
Ski boat
Boating

References

External links 
Z1 Boats Manufacturer's Web Site

Boat types
American boat builders